Sthenopis regius is a species of moth of the family Hepialidae. It was described by Staudinger in 1896, and is known from China.

References

External links
Hepialidae genera

Moths described in 1896
Hepialidae